The Remix is an Indian reality competition streaming television series. It is an Amazon Prime Video original series and premiered on 9 March 2018. Hosted by Karan Tacker, the show is a music challenge where musicians remix Bollywood songs and they are judged by Sunidhi Chauhan, Amit Trivedi and Nucleya.

Episodes

References 

2018 Indian television series debuts
2018 Indian television seasons
Amazon Prime Video original programming
Indian reality television series
Indian television series based on non-Indian television series